Blackham is a village in the Wealden district of East Sussex. It lies within the Withyham civil parish. The village is situated on the East Sussex-Kent border.

The name Blackham (Black Hamlet) comes from the village being known as the resting place for smugglers returning from the coast with their booty as it was exactly one day's ride from Dover. At the time, it was described as a 'den of iniquity' due to the raucous and often violent behaviour of the smugglers.

Hever Castle (the childhood home of Anne Boleyn), Penshurst Place and Bolebroke Castle, all regularly frequented by Henry VIII are all within 4 miles of Blackham as is the village of Hartfield - the home of Christopher Robin, Winnie-the-Pooh, and the actual "Pooh Bridge" location in Ashdown Forest where people still play poohsticks.

Villages in East Sussex
Withyham